Globe Jet SAL was an aviation company based in Beirut, Lebanon, offering wet leasing and charter services to airlines and other companies. Its main base was in Beirut Rafic Hariri International Airport.

History 
The airline was established in December 2003, and started operations in January 2004. As of July 2007, it has 130 employees, and a fleet size of 5 Lockheed L-1011-500 Tristar.

In 2007, the airline ceased all operations. By 2008 all the TriStars had been sold or withdrawn from use.

Fleet 

According to their website, the Globe Jet fleet consisted of the following aircraft (as of 2007):

References

External links 
Globe Jet official website

Defunct airlines of Lebanon
Airlines established in 2003
Airlines disestablished in 2007
2003 establishments in Lebanon